Gigi Causey is an American film and television producer, production supervisor, and manager who resides in Los Angeles. On January 24, 2012, Causey was nominated for the 2012 Academy Award for Best Live Action Short Film for Time Freak which she produced. Causey is married to filmmaker Andrew Bowler, who was also nominated for an Academy Award for the film Time Freak.

Filmography

Producer
Film
 If I Didn't Care (2007)
 Time Freak (2011)
Television
 Queer Eye (1 episode, 2006)
 The Detonators (11 episodes, 2009)

Production supervisor
Film
 Keane (2004)
 The Lucky Ones (2008)
 Nick and Norah's Infinite Playlist (2008)
 May the Best Man Win (2009)
 Brooklyn to Manhattan (2010)
 Vamps (2012)
 Safe House (2012)
Television
 All Worked Up (6 episodes, 2009)
 Arctic Roughnecks (2009)

Production manager
Film
 Before It Had a Name (2005)
Television
 Queer Eye (2003)
 Knock First (2003)
 Home Delivery (2004)
 Beer League (2006)

Production designer
Film
 Sanity (1998)
 Olympia (1998)
 Trespasses (1999)

Recognition

Awards and nominations
 2012, nominated for Academy Award, 'Best Short Film, Live Action' for Time Freak
 2011, won festival prize for 'Best Short' at Route 66 Film Festival for Time Freak
 2011, won Jury Award for 'Best Short' at Stony Brook Film Festival for Time Freak
 2011, nominated for Jury Award for 'Best Short Film' at Omaha Film Festival for Time Freak

References

External links
 

Living people
American film producers
Place of birth missing (living people)
Year of birth missing (living people)
Unit production managers